Margaret Mary Day Lockwood, CBE (15 September 1916 – 15 July 1990), was an English actress. One of Britain's most popular film stars of the 1930s and 1940s, her film appearances included The Lady Vanishes (1938), Night Train to Munich (1940), The Man in Grey (1943), and The Wicked Lady (1945). She was nominated for the BAFTA Award for Best British Actress for the 1955 film Cast a Dark Shadow. She also starred in the television series Justice (1971–74).

Early life
Lockwood was born on 15 September 1916 in Karachi, British India, to Henry Francis Lockwood, an English administrator of a railway company, and his third wife, Scottish-born Margaret Eveline Waugh. She returned to England in 1920 with her mother, brother 'Lyn' and half-brother Frank, and a further half-sister 'Fay' joined them the following year, but her father remained in Karachi, visiting them infrequently. She also had another half-brother, John, from her father's first marriage, brought up by his mother in Britain. Lockwood attended Sydenham High School for girls, and a ladies' school in Kensington, London.

She began studying for the stage at an early age at the Italia Conti Academy of Theatre Arts, and made her debut in 1928, at the age of 12, at the Holborn Empire where she played a fairy in A Midsummer Night's Dream. In December of the following year, she appeared at the Scala Theatre in the pantomime The Babes in the Wood. In 1932 she appeared at the Theatre Royal, Drury Lane in Cavalcade.

Career

In 1933, Lockwood enrolled at the Royal Academy of Dramatic Art in London, where she was seen by a talent scout and signed to a contract. In June 1934 she played Myrtle in House on Fire at the Queen's Theatre, and on 22 August 1934 appeared as Margaret Hamilton in Gertrude Jenning's play Family Affairs when it premiered at the Ambassadors Theatre; Helene Ferber in Repayment at the Arts Theatre in January 1936; Trixie Drew in Henry Bernard's play Miss Smith at the Duke of York's Theatre in July 1936; and back at the Queen's in July 1937 as Ann Harlow in Ann's Lapse.

Films
Lockwood entered films in 1934, and in 1935 she appeared in the film version of Lorna Doone. For this, British Lion put her under contract for £500 a year for the first year, going up to £750 a year for the second year.

For British Lion she was in The Case of Gabriel Perry (1935), then was in Honours Easy (1935) with Greta Nissen and Man of the Moment (1935) with Douglas Fairbanks Jnr. These were standard ingénue roles. She was the female love interest in Midshipman Easy (1935), directed by Carol Reed, who would become crucial to Lockwood's career. She had the lead in Someday (1935), a quota quickie directed by Michael Powell and in Jury's Evidence (1936), directed by Ralph Ince.

Lockwood had a small role in The Amateur Gentleman (1936), another with Fairbanks. Her profile rose when she appeared opposite Maurice Chevalier in The Beloved Vagabond (1936)

She followed it with Irish for Luck (1936) and The Street Singer (1937). She had a small role in Who's Your Lady Friend? (1937), again for Carol Reed and was in Melody and Romance (1937).

Gaumont British
Gaumont British were making a film version of the novel Doctor Syn, starring George Arliss and Anna Lee with director Roy William Neill and producer Edward Black. Lee dropped out and was replaced by Lockwood. Lockwood so impressed the studio with her performance – particularly Black, who became a champion of hers – she signed a three-year contract with Gainsborough Pictures in June 1937. This was at £4,000 a year.

For Black and director Robert Stevenson she supported Will Fyffe in Owd Bob (1938), opposite John Loder.

British Stardom: Bank Holiday and The Lady Vanishes

Lockwood then had her best chance to-date, being given the lead in Bank Holiday, directed by Carol Reed and produced by Black. This movie was a hit and launched Lockwood as a star. She called it "my first really big picture... with a beautifully written script and a wonderful part for me." Gaumont increased her contract from three years to six.

Even more popular was her next movie, The Lady Vanishes, directed by Alfred Hitchcock, produced by Black and co-starring Michael Redgrave.  Lockwood called it "one of the films I have enjoyed most in all my career." Hitchcock was greatly impressed by Lockwood, telling the press:
She has an undoubted gift in expressing her beauty in terms of emotion, which is exceptionally well suited to the camera. Allied to this is the fact that she photographs more than normally easily, and has an extraordinary insight in getting the feel of her lines, to live within them, so to speak, as long as the duration of the picture lasts. It is not too much to expect that, in Margaret Lockwood, the British picture industry has a possibility of developing a star of hitherto un-anticipated possibilities.
She followed this with A Girl Must Live, a musical comedy about chorus girls for Black and Reed. It was one of a series of films made by Gaumont aimed at the US market. According to Filmink Lockwood's "speciality [now] was playing a bright young thing who got up to mischief, usually by accident rather than design, and she often got to drive the action."

American films
Gaumont British had distribution agreements with 20th Century Fox in the US and they expressed an interest in borrowing Lockwood for some films. She travelled to Los Angeles and was put to work supporting Shirley Temple in Susannah of the Mounties (1939), set in Canada, opposite Randolph Scott. She was borrowed by Paramount for Rulers of the Sea (1939), with Will Fyffe and Douglas Fairbanks Jr. Paramount indicated a desire to use Lockwood in more films but she decided to go home.

Return to Britain
Lockwood returned to Britain in June 1939. She was meant to make film versions of Rob Roy and The Blue Lagoon but both projects were cancelled with the advent of war. Instead, she played the role of Jenny Sunley, the self-centred, frivolous wife of Michael Redgrave's character in The Stars Look Down for Carol Reed. Lockwood later admitted "I was far from being reconciled to my role of the unpleasant girl and everyone treated me warily. But as the film progressed I found myself working with Carol Reed and Michael Redgrave again and gradually I was fascinated to see what I could put into the part."

She did another with Reed, Night Train to Munich (1940), an attempt to repeat the success of The Lady Vanishes with the same screenwriters (Launder and Gilliat) and characters of Charters and Caldicott. Rex Harrison was the male star. This started filming in November 1939.

She was meant to be reunited with Reed and Redgrave in The Girl in the News (1940) but Redgrave dropped out and was replaced by Barry K. Barnes: Black produced and Sidney Gilliat wrote the script. Quiet Wedding (1941) was a comedy directed by Anthony Asquith. She was meant to appear in Hatter's Castle but fell pregnant and had to drop out. Her return to acting was Alibi (1942), a thriller which she called "anything but a success... a bad film."

In September 1943 Variety estimated her salary at being US$24,000 per picture.

Career peak

The Man in Grey
Lockwood was well established as a middle-tier name. What made her a front rank star was The Man in Grey (1943), the first of what would be known as the Gainsborough melodramas. Lockwood wanted to play the part of Clarissa, but producer Edward Black cast her as the villainous Hesther. She was featured alongside Phyllis Calvert, James Mason and Stewart Granger for director Leslie Arliss. The film was a massive hit, one of the biggest in 1943 Britain, and made all four lead actors into top stars – at the end of the year, exhibitors voted Lockwood the seventh most popular British star at the box office.

She appeared in two comedies for Black: Dear Octopus (1943) with Michael Wilding from a play by Dodie Smith, which Lockwood felt was a backward step and Give Us the Moon (1944), with Vic Oliver directed by Val Guest. Much more popular than either of these was another melodrama with Arliss and Granger, Love Story (1944), where she played a terminally ill pianist.

Lockwood was reunited with James Mason in A Place of One's Own (1945), playing a housekeeper possessed by the spirit of a dead girl, but the film was not a success. I'll Be Your Sweetheart (1945) was a musical with Guest and Vic Oliver.

The Wicked Lady
Lockwood had the biggest success of her career to-date with the title role in The Wicked Lady (1945), opposite Mason and Michael Rennie for director Arliss.  The film was the most popular movie at the British box office in 1946. In 1946, Lockwood gained the Daily Mail National Film Awards First Prize for most popular British film actress. However she was soon to suffer what has been called "a cold streak of poor films which few other stars have endured."

She was offered the role of Bianca in The Magic Bow but disliked the part and turned it down. Instead she was a murderess in Bedelia (1946), which did not perform as well, although it was popular in Britain.

Contract with Rank
In July 1946, Lockwood signed a six-year contract with Rank to make two movies a year. The first of these was Hungry Hill (1947), an expensive adaptation of the novel by Daphne du Maurier which was not the expected success at the box office.

More popular was Jassy (1947), the seventh biggest hit at the British box office in 1947. It was the last of "official" Gainsborough melodramas – the studio had come under the control of J. Arthur Rank who disliked the genre.

She was a warden in The White Unicorn (1947), a melodrama from the team of Harold Huth and John Corfield. Rank wanted to star her in a film about Mary Magdalene but Lockwood was unhappy with the script. She refused to appear in Roses for Her Pillow (which became Once Upon a Dream) and was put on suspension.  "I was sick of getting mediocre parts and poor scripts," she later wrote. "Since 1945 I had been sick of it... there had been little or no improvement to me in the films I was being offered."  She later said "I was having fun being a rebel."

During her suspension she went on a publicity tour for Rank. She also appeared in an acclaimed TV production of Pygmalion (1948). then went off suspension when she made a comedy for Corfield and Huth, Look Before You Love (1948).

Lockwood had a change of pace with the comedy Cardboard Cavalier (1949), with Lockwood playing Nell Gwyn opposite Sid Field. The film was a critical and box-office disappointment. "I was terribly distressed when I read the press notices of the film", wrote Lockwood.

That same year, Lockwood was announced to play Becky Sharp in a film adaptation of Vanity Fair but it was not made.

Lockwood was in the melodrama Madness of the Heart (1949), but the film was not a particular success. When a proposed film about Elisabeth of Austria was cancelled, she returned to the stage in a record-breaking national tour of Noël Coward's Private Lives (1949) and then played the title role in productions of J. M. Barrie's Peter Pan in 1949 and 1950. She also performed in a pantomime of Cinderella for the Royal Film performance with Jean Simmons; Lockwood called this "the jolliest show in which I have ever taken part."

She returned to film-making after an 18-month absence to star in Highly Dangerous (1950), a comic thriller in the vein of Lady Vanishes written expressly for her by Eric Ambler and directed by Roy Ward Baker. It was not popular. Rank was to put her in an adaptation of Ann Veronica by H. G. Wells but the film was postponed. She turned down the female lead in The Browning Version, and a proposed sequel to The Wicked Lady, The Wicked Lady's Daughter, was never made.

Eventually her contract with Rank ended and she played Eliza Doolittle in George Bernard Shaw's Pygmalion at the Edinburgh Festival of 1951.

Herbert Wilcox
In 1952, Lockwood signed a two picture a year contract with Herbert Wilcox at $112,000 a year, making her the best paid actress in British films. Lockwood said Wilcox and his wife Anna Neagle promised from signing the contract "I was never allowed to forget that I was a really bright and dazzling star on their horizon. They were going to look after me as no one else had done before. They did. And I loved it."

The association began well with Trent's Last Case (1952) with Michael Wilding and Orson Welles which was popular. She appeared on TV in Ann Veronica and another TV adaptation of the Shaw play Captain Brassbound's Conversion (1953).

Her next two films for Wilcox were commercial disappointments: Laughing Anne (1953) and Trouble in the Glen (1954). She made no more films with Wilcox who called her "a director's joy who can shade a performance or a character with computer accuracy" but admitted their collaboration "did not come off."

Lockwood returned to the stage in Spider's Web (1954) by Agatha Christie, expressly written for her.

She then appeared in a thriller, Cast a Dark Shadow (1955) with Dirk Bogarde for director Lewis Gilbert. Gilbert later said "It was reasonably successful, but, by then, Margaret had been in several really bad films and her name on a picture was rather counter-productive."

Later career

Television
As her popularity waned in the post war years, she returned to occasional performances on the West End stage and appeared on television; her television debut was in 1948 when she played Eliza Doolittle.

She was in a BBC adaptation of Christie's Spider's Web (1955), Janet Green's Murder Mistaken (1956), Dodie Smith's Call It a Day (1956) and Arnold Bennett's The Great Adventure (1958).

She had the lead in a TV series The Royalty (1957–1958) and appeared regularly on TV anthology series. She played an aging West End star attempting a comeback in The Human Jungle with Herbert Lom (1965). She starred in another series The Flying Swan (1965).

Later career
Her subsequent long-running West End hits include an all-star production of Oscar Wilde's An Ideal Husband (1965–66, in which she played the villainous Mrs Cheveley), W. Somerset Maugham's Lady Frederick (1970), Relative Values (Noël Coward revival, 1973) and the thrillers Signpost to Murder (1962) and Double Edge (1975).

In 1969 she starred as barrister Julia Stanford in the TV play Justice is a Woman. This inspired the Yorkshire Television series Justice, which ran for three seasons (39 episodes) from 1971 to 1974, and featured her real-life partner, John Stone, as fictional boyfriend Dr Ian Moody. Lockwood's role as the feisty Harriet Peterson won her Best Actress Awards from the TV Times (1971) and The Sun (1973). In 1975, film director Bryan Forbes persuaded her out of an apparent retirement from feature films to play the role of the Stepmother in her last feature film The Slipper and the Rose. This film also included the final appearance of Edith Evans and one of the later appearances of Kenneth More.

Her last professional appearance was as Queen Alexandra in Royce Ryton's stage play Motherdear (Ambassadors Theatre, 1980).

Margaret Lockwood was appointed a Commander of the Order of the British Empire (CBE) in the 1981 New Year Honours.

A Margaret Lockwood performance was apparently the inspiration for Sean Pertwee'''s death scene in the 2002 film Dog Soldiers. When asked about this, he referred to the foul grimace her character Julia Stanford readily expressed in the TV play Justice Is a Woman.

She was the subject on an episode of This Is Your Life in December 1963. She was a guest on the BBC radio show Desert Island Discs on 25 April 1951.

Personal life
Lockwood married Rupert Leon in 1937 (divorced in 1950). She lived her final years in seclusion in Kingston upon Thames, dying on 15 July 1990 at the Cromwell Hospital, Kensington, London, from cirrhosis of the liver, aged 73. Her body was cremated at Putney Vale Crematorium. She was survived by her daughter, the actress Julia Lockwood (née Margaret Julia Leon, 1941–2019).

Filmography

Unmade films
adaptation of Rob Roy (1939) with Will Fyffe and Michael Redgrave
adaptation of The Blue Lagoon (1939) with Richard GreeneThe Reluctant Widow – announced 1946Mary Magdalene written by Clemence Dane – Lockwood said she was "really looking forward" to making the film in 1947.Trial for Murder (1940s) – proposed Hollywood film from Mark Robson

Theatre creditsFamily Affairs by Gertrude Jennings (1934)Spider's WebSubway in the Sky (March 1957)

Awards
1946 – Daily Mail National Film Awards Most Outstanding British actress during the war years
1947 – Daily Mail National Film Awards Best Film Actress of the year
1948 – Daily Mail National Film Awards Best Film Actress of the year in Jassy1955 – BAFTA nomination for Best British Actress in Cast a Dark Shadow''
1961 – Daily Mirror Television Award.
1971 – TV Times. Best Actress Award
1973 – The Sun. Best Actress Award

Box-office popularity
Various polls of exhibitors consistently listed Lockwood among the most popular stars of her era:
 1943 – 7th most popular British star in Britain
 1944 – 6th most popular British star in Britain
 1945 – 3rd most popular British star in Britain (Phyllis Calvert was 5th)
 1946 – 10th most popular star in Australia, 3rd most popular star and 2nd most popular British star in Britain
 1947 – 4th most popular star and 3rd most popular British star in Britain
 1948 – 3rd most popular star and 2nd most popular British star in Britain, most popular female star in Canada
 1949 – 5th most popular British star in Britain

References

Citations

Bibliography

External links

Stage performances in University of Bristol Theatre Archive
 Photographs of Margaret Lockwood
.
Photos of Margaret Lockwood at Silver Sirens
The Margaret Lockwood Society 

1916 births
1990 deaths
English people of Scottish descent
Actresses from London
People educated at the Arts Educational Schools
Alumni of RADA
Burials at Putney Vale Cemetery
Commanders of the Order of the British Empire
Deaths from cirrhosis
English film actresses
English stage actresses
English television actresses
People educated at Sydenham High School
20th-century English actresses
People from Karachi
British people in colonial India